Olympique de Marseille had a solid season, but did not manage to win the elusive trophy they had chased for 14 years, with the biggest disappointment being losing on penalty shootout against Sochaux in the Coupe de France final. The 2nd-place finish of Ligue 1 was the best for eight years, but the side were never in title contention, being 18 points adrift of Lyon.

Squad

Goalkeepers
  Cédric Carrasso
  Sébastien Hamel
  Mehdi Sennaoui

Defenders
  Renato Civelli
  Taye Taiwo
  Julien Rodriguez
  Alain Cantareil
  Garry Bocaly
  Ronald Zubar
  Hassoun Camara
  Boštjan Cesar
  Habib Beye

Midfielders
  Franck Ribéry
  Wilson Oruma
  Modeste M'Bami
  Lorik Cana
  Samir Nasri
  Mame N'Diaye
  Salomon Olembé
  Mathieu Valbuena

Attackers
  Djibril Cissé
  Mickaël Pagis
  Mamadou Niang
  Toifilou Maoulida
  Salim Arrache
  Habib Bamogo

Competitions

Ligue 1

League table

Results summary

Results by round

Matches

Intertoto Cup

Third round

UEFA Cup

Second qualifying round

First round

Sources
   FootballSquads - Marseille 2006/2007
   LFP.fr - Ligue de Football Professionel

Olympique de Marseille seasons
Marseille